The Pi Kappa Phi fraternity has initiated over 100,000 members since it was founded in 1904.  Among these initiates, are a number of notable alumni that have been involved in politics, business, athletics, science, and entertainment.

Business

Arts and entertainment

Government

Legislative

Judicial

Military

Higher education and non-profit

Journalism

Literature

Religion

Sciences

Sports

References

External links
 Pi Kapps Online Notable Alumni

Pi Kappa Phi
Lists of members of United States student societies